Theresa Wallis (born 3 June 1957) is a British alpine skier. She competed in two events at the 1976 Winter Olympics.

References

1957 births
Living people
British female alpine skiers
Olympic alpine skiers of Great Britain
Alpine skiers at the 1976 Winter Olympics
Place of birth missing (living people)